Father Takes the Air is a 1951 American comedy film directed by Frank McDonald and written by D.D. Beauchamp. The film stars Raymond Walburn, Walter Catlett, Gary Gray, Florence Bates, Barbara Brown, M'liss McClure and James Brown. The film was released on June 17, 1951 by Monogram Pictures.

Plot

Cast          
Raymond Walburn as Henry Latham
Walter Catlett as Mayor George Colton
Gary Gray as David Latham
Florence Bates as Minerva Bobbin
Barbara Brown as Mrs. Latham
M'liss McClure as Barbara Latham
James Brown as Bob 
Georgie Nokes as Georgie Colton 
Carl Milletaire as Gordon Bennett
Tom Dugan as Benny
Billy Bletcher as Haggarly
Maxine Semon as Miss Wells
Don Hicks as Charlie Twitchell
Joan Valerie as Blonde

References

External links
 

1951 films
1950s English-language films
American comedy films
1951 comedy films
Monogram Pictures films
Films directed by Frank McDonald
American black-and-white films
1950s American films